Southbrook may refer to:
 Southbrook Township, Cottonwood County, Minnesota
 Southbrook, Monmouthshire, Wales
 Southbrook, Queensland, Australia
 Southbrook, Wiltshire, England 
 Southbrook, New Zealand, a suburb of Rangiora in North Canterbury